The 1986 New Zealand Royal Visit Honours were appointments by Elizabeth II to the Royal Victorian Order, to mark her visit to New Zealand that year. The honours were announced between 28 February and 2 March 1986.

The recipients of honours are displayed here as they were styled before their new honour.

Royal Victorian Order

Knight Grand Cross (GCVO)

 The Most Reverend Sir Paul Alfred Reeves  – governor-general of New Zealand

Commander (CVO)

 Edward James Babe

Lieutenant (LVO)

 Genevieve Margaret Jordan

Member (MVO)

 Helen Lorraine Aitken
 Ian Gordon Edward Coddington – chief traffic superintendent, Ministry of Transport
 Judith Anne McConway
 Lieutenant Anthony Jonathan Parr – Royal New Zealand Navy
 Ronald Edward Terry

Royal Victorian Medal

Bar to the Royal Victorian Medal (Silver) (RVM)

 Sergeant Peter Forbes Orr  – New Zealand Police

Silver (RVM)

 Frederick James Page

Bronze (RVM)

 Evelyn Doris Hodson

References

1986 awards
Royal Visit Honours
Monarchy in New Zealand